Nyheim Hines (born November 12, 1996) is an American football running back and punt returner for the Buffalo Bills of the National Football League (NFL). He played college football at NC State, and was drafted by the Indianapolis Colts in the fourth round of the 2018 NFL Draft.

Early years
Hines attended Garner Magnet High School in Garner, North Carolina. During his high school football career, he had 6,242 rushing yards, 7,299 total yards, and 126 touchdowns while playing for the Trojans. He scored seven touchdowns in a single game twice, which is among his 15 school records. He committed to North Carolina State University to play college football.

College career
Hines played at NC State from 2015 to 2017 under head coach Dave Doeren. As a junior in 2017, he rushed for 1,112 yards on 197 carries with 12 touchdowns. After the season, he decided to forgo his senior year and enter the 2018 NFL Draft. He finished his career with 1,400 rushing yards and 13 rushing touchdowns.

In addition, Hines was a member of NC State's track team. At the ACC outdoor track and field championships he placed third in the 100 meters, with a personal-best time of 10.34 seconds. He also recorded a personal-best time of 21.31 seconds in 200 meters, placing him eighth. His personal-best in the 60 meters is 6.71 seconds, placing him third at the ACC indoor championships.

Collegiate statistics

Professional career
Hines' 4.38 second 40-yard dash was the fastest among 2018 NFL Draft Combine running backs.

Indianapolis Colts

2018

Hines was drafted by the Indianapolis Colts in the fourth round, 104th overall of the 2018 NFL Draft.  In his NFL debut, a season-opening 34–23 loss to the Cincinnati Bengals, Hines had five carries for 19 rushing yards along with seven receptions for 33 receiving yards. In the following game, a 21–9 victory over the Washington Redskins, Hines scored his first professional touchdown, an eight-yard rush. In Week 4, against the Houston Texans, Hines had nine receptions for 63 receiving yards and two receiving touchdowns in the overtime loss. Overall, he finished his rookie season with 314 rushing yards, two rushing touchdowns, 63 receptions, 425 receiving yards, and two receiving touchdowns. In the Wild Card Round against the Houston Texans, he played but recorded no meaningful statistics in his playoff debut, a 21–7 victory. In the Divisional Round against the Kansas City Chiefs, he had three carries for 24 rushing yards in the 31–13 loss.

2019
In Week 16 against the Carolina Panthers, Hines returned two punts for touchdowns, the first one being an 84-yard return and the second one being a 71-yard return, during the 38–6 win. He became the first player since Darius Reynaud in 2012 to have two punt returns for a touchdown in a single game. In addition, he became the first player in franchise history to accomplish the feat. He earned AFC Special Teams Player of the Week. Overall, Hines finished the 2019 season with 52 carries for 199 rushing yards and two rushing touchdowns to go along with 44 receptions for 320 receiving yards.

2020
In the Colts' 2020 season opener against the Jacksonville Jaguars, Hines rushed for 28 yards and a rushing touchdown and caught eight passes for 45 yards and a receiving touchdown in the 27–20 loss. In Week 8 against the Detroit Lions, Hines recorded 54 receiving yards and two receiving touchdowns in the 41–21 victory. In Week 10 against the Tennessee Titans on Thursday Night Football, he had 115 scrimmage yards, one rushing touchdown, and one receiving touchdown in the 34–17 victory. In the 2020 season, Hines finished with 89 carries for 380 rushing yards and three rushing touchdowns to go along with 63 receptions for 482 receiving yards and four receiving touchdowns.

2021

On September 10, 2021, Hines signed a three-year, $18.6 million contract extension with the Colts. Hines finished the 2021 season with 56	carries for 276 rushing yards and two rushing touchdowns to go along with 40 receptions for 310 receiving yards and one receiving touchdown.

Buffalo Bills
On November 1, 2022, the Colts traded Hines to the Buffalo Bills in exchange for running back Zack Moss and a conditional sixth round pick in the 2023 NFL Draft. In Week 18 against the New England Patriots, Hines returned two kickoffs for touchdowns, becoming the eleventh NFL player to do so in a single game in the 35-23 win.

NFL career statistics

Regular season

Postseason

Personal life
Hines' twin sister, Nyah, competed for the NC State track and field team. Hines has worked at Bojangle's in the off-season to prepare for business after football.

Notes

References

External links

Buffalo Bills bio
NC State Wolfpack bio

1996 births
Living people
People from Garner, North Carolina
Players of American football from North Carolina
Twin sportspeople
American football running backs
American football return specialists
NC State Wolfpack football players
Indianapolis Colts players
Buffalo Bills players